Gambier is a village in Knox County, Ohio, United States. The population was 2,391 at the 2010 census.

Gambier is the home of Kenyon College. A major feature is a gravel path running the length of the village, referred to as "Middle Path". This path has become a piece of Gambier's history, as it is used by college students and residents alike as a way through the community.

History

Gambier was laid out in 1824. The village was named after one of Kenyon College's early benefactors, Lord Gambier. In the 1960s, Japanese writer Junzo Shono spent several years in Gambier, culminating in the writing of the book A Sojourn in Gambier, which would prove to be quite popular in Japan.

In May 2020, the Village of Gambier became the first municipality in Knox County to establish anti-discrimination legislation for LGBTQ+ people.

Geography
Gambier is located along the Kokosing River.

Demographics

2010 census
At the 2010 census there were 2,391 people, 343 households, and 126 families living in the village. The racial makeup of the village was 90.5% White, 2.8% African American, 0.2% Native American, 2.0% Asian, 0.8% from other races, and 3.7% from two or more races. Hispanic or Latino of any race were 2.8%.

Of the 343 households 15.2% had children under the age of 18 living with them, 30.6% were married couples living together, 4.7% had a female householder with no husband present, 1.5% had a male householder with no wife present, and 63.3% were non-families. 33.5% of households were one person and 11.4% were one person aged 65 or older. The average household size was 2.39 and the average family size was 2.76.

The median age in the village was 21.2 years. 4% of residents were under the age of 18; 79.6% were between the ages of 18 and 24; 5.1% were from 25 to 44; 6.7% were from 45 to 64; and 4.5% were 65 or older. The gender makeup of the village was 47.3% male and 52.7% female.

2000 census
At the 2000 census there were 1,871 people, 278 households, and 142 families living in the village. The population density was 1,998.5 people per square mile (768.5/km). There were 305 housing units at an average density of 325.8 per square mile (125.3/km).  The racial makeup of the village was 94.07% White, 2.51% African American, 1.28% Asian, 0.05% Pacific Islander, 0.43% from other races, and 1.66% from two or more races. Hispanic or Latino of any race were 1.66%.

Of the 278 households 22.3% had children under the age of 18 living with them, 43.9% were married couples living together, 6.5% had a female householder with no husband present, and 48.9% were non-families. 39.9% of households were one person and 12.2% were one person aged 65 or older. The average household size was 2.03 and the average family size was 2.77.

The age distribution was 5.8% under the age of 18, 73.1% from 18 to 24, 7.3% from 25 to 44, 9.0% from 45 to 64, and 4.9% 65 or older. The median age was 21 years. For every 100 females there were 82.7 males. For every 100 females age 18 and over, there were 81.6 males.

The median household income was $51,964 and the median family income  was $71,477. Males had a median income of $40,500 versus $29,327 for females. The per capita income for the village was $9,661. About 2.5% of families and 8.0% of the population were below the poverty line, including 5.2% of those under age 18 and 2.6% of those age 65 or over.

Education

Mount Vernon City Schools operates Wiggin Street Elementary in the village.

Kenyon College, an Episcopal institution, has been in operation in Gambier since 1824.

Gambier has a public library, a branch of The Public Library of Mount Vernon & Knox County.

Notable people
 Margaret L. Bodine, photographer
 Philander Chase, founder of Kenyon College, Bishop of Ohio and Illinois, Sixth Presiding Bishop of the National Episcopal church
 P. F. Kluge, author of Biggest Elvis: A Novel
 Robie Macauley, newspaperman and author
 Paul Newman, American actor
 Olof Palme, Prime Minister of Sweden
 Herbert T. Perrin, U.S. Army officer
 Joan Slonczewski, biologist
John Green, author of The Fault in our Stars, YouTuber

References

External links
 Village website
 
 

Villages in Knox County, Ohio
Villages in Ohio
1824 establishments in Ohio
Populated places established in 1824